Montanelia is a genus of fungi belonging to the family Parmeliaceae.

The genus has almost cosmopolitan distribution.

Species:
 Montanelia disjuncta 
 Montanelia occultipanniformis 
 Montanelia panniformis 
 Montanelia predisjuncta 
 Montanelia saximontana 
 Montanelia secwepemc 
 Montanelia sorediata 
 Montanelia tominii

References

Lichen genera
Parmeliaceae
Fungi